Cheviot was a parliamentary electorate in the Canterbury region of New Zealand, from 1858 to 1890. It was named after what was then one of the country's largest sheep stations, Cheviot Hills.

Population centres
The initial 24 New Zealand electorates were defined by Governor George Grey in March 1853, based on the New Zealand Constitution Act 1852 that had been passed by the British government. The Constitution Act also allowed the House of Representatives to establish new electorates, and this was first done in 1858, when four new electorates were formed by splitting existing electorates.

The Cheviot electorate was entirely rural. The returning officer, George Leslie Lee, decided on two polling stations for the first election in December 1859, and they were both sheep stations of runholders: Robinson's station Cheviot Hills, and Mason's Old Station at Waituhi Creek.

History
The first election in the Cheviot electorate was held on 18 December 1859, which was partway through the term of the 2nd New Zealand Parliament. Edward Jollie was the first representative. Charles Hunter Brown announced his candidacy for the 1 March 1861 election long before the election date was set. Frederick Weld was narrowly defeated in the 15 February 1861 election in the  electorate and subsequently became a candidate in Cheviot, where he defeated Brown. In the 1866 election, David Monro was declared elected unopposed.

Leonard Harper was the only representative who did not serve through his whole term – he resigned on 2 April 1878. The subsequent 1878 by-election, held on 27 May, was won by Alfred Saunders.

The electorate was abolished in 1890.

Election results
The electorate was represented by eight Members of Parliament:

Key

Election results

1878 by-election

1861 election

See also
History and naming of the town of Cheviot

Notes

References

 

Historical electorates of New Zealand
1858 establishments in New Zealand
1890 disestablishments in New Zealand